Diving disorders are medical conditions specifically arising from underwater diving. The signs and symptoms of these may present during a dive, on surfacing, or up to several hours after a dive. Divers have to breathe a gas which is at the same pressure as their surroundings (ambient pressure), which can be much greater than on the surface.

The principal conditions are decompression illness (which covers decompression sickness and arterial gas embolism), nitrogen narcosis, high pressure nervous syndrome, oxygen toxicity, and pulmonary barotrauma (burst lung). Although some of these may occur in other settings, they are of particular concern during diving activities.

The disorders are caused by breathing gas at the high pressures encountered at depth, and divers will often breathe a gas mixture different from air to mitigate these effects. Nitrox, which contains more oxygen and less nitrogen, is commonly used as a breathing gas to reduce the risk of decompression sickness at recreational depths (up to about ). Helium may be added to reduce the amount of nitrogen and oxygen in the gas mixture when diving deeper, to reduce the effects of narcosis and to avoid the risk of oxygen toxicity. More exotic mixtures such as hydreliox, a hydrogen–helium–oxygen mixture, are used at extreme depths to counteract this.

Decompression sickness 

Decompression sickness (DCS) occurs when gas, which has been breathed under high pressure and dissolved into the body tissues, forms bubbles as the pressure is reduced on ascent from a dive. The results may range from pain in the joints where the bubbles form to blockage of an artery leading to damage to the nervous system, paralysis or death. While bubbles can form anywhere in the body, DCS is most frequently observed in the shoulders, elbows, knees, and ankles. Joint pain occurs in about 90% of DCS cases reported to the U.S. Navy, with neurological symptoms and skin manifestations each present in 10% to 15% of cases. Pulmonary DCS is very rare in divers. The table below classifies the effects by affected organ and bubble location.

Arterial gas embolism and pulmonary barotrauma 

If the compressed air in a diver's lungs cannot freely escape during an ascent, particularly a rapid one, then the lung tissues may rupture, causing pulmonary barotrauma (PBT). The air may then enter the arterial circulation producing arterial gas embolism (AGE), with effects similar to severe decompression sickness. Although AGE may occur as a result of other causes, it is most often secondary to PBT. AGE is the second most common cause of death while diving (drowning being the most common stated cause of death). Gas bubbles within the arterial circulation can block the supply of blood to any part of the body, including the brain, and can therefore manifest a vast variety of symptoms. The following table presents those signs and symptoms which have been observed in more than ten percent of cases diagnosed as AGE, with approximate estimates of frequency.

Other conditions that can be caused by pulmonary barotrauma include pneumothorax, mediastinal emphysema and interstitial emphysema.

Nitrogen narcosis 

Nitrogen narcosis is caused by the pressure of dissolved gas in the body and produces impairment to the nervous system. This results in alteration to thought processes and a decrease in the diver's ability to make judgements or calculations. It can also decrease motor skills, and worsen performance in tasks requiring manual dexterity. As depth increases, so does the pressure and hence the severity of the narcosis. The effects may vary widely from individual to individual, and from day to day for the same diver. Because of the perception-altering effects of narcosis, a diver may not be aware of the symptoms, but studies have shown that impairment occurs nevertheless. Since the choice of breathing gas also affects the depth at which narcosis occurs, the table below represents typical manifestations when breathing air.

High pressure nervous syndrome 

This became known as high pressure nervous syndrome, and its effects are found to result from both the absolute depth and the speed of descent. Although the effects vary from person to person, they are stable and reproducible for each individual; the list below summarises the symptoms observed underwater and in studies using simulated dives in the dry, using recompression chambers and electroencephalography (EEG) monitors.

Oxygen toxicity 

Although oxygen is essential to life, in concentrations greater than normal it becomes toxic, overcoming the body's natural defences (antioxidants), and causing cell death in any part of the body. The lungs and brain are particularly affected by high partial pressures of oxygen, such as are encountered in diving. Susceptibility to oxygen toxicity varies dramatically from person to person, and to a much smaller extent from day to day for the same diver. Prior to convulsion, several symptoms may be present – most distinctly that of an aura.

During 1942 and 1943, Professor Kenneth W Donald, working at the Admiralty Experimental Diving Unit, carried out over 2,000 experiments on divers to examine the effects of oxygen toxicity. To date, no comparable series of studies has been performed. Five of the subjects convulsed, and the others recovered when returned to normal pressure following the appearance of acute symptoms. The table below summarises the results for the relative frequency of the symptoms, and the earliest and latest time of onset, as observed by Donald. The wide variety of symptoms and large variability of onset between individuals typical of oxygen toxicity are clearly illustrated.

Note

References

Further reading 
 
 
 
 

Diving medicine